The 2019–20 Virginia Tech Hokies men's basketball team represented Virginia Polytechnic Institute and State University during the 2019–20 NCAA Division I men's basketball season. The Hokies were led by first-year head coach Mike Young and played their home games at Cassell Coliseum in Blacksburg, Virginia as members of the Atlantic Coast Conference.

The Hokies finished the season 16–16, and 7–13 in ACC play.  They lost to North Carolina in the first round of the ACC tournament.  The tournament was cancelled before the Quarterfinals due to the COVID-19 pandemic.  The NCAA tournament and NIT were also cancelled due to the pandemic.

Previous season
They finished the 2018–19 season 26–9, 12–6 in ACC play to finish in fifth place. They defeated Miami (FL) in the second round of the ACC tournament before losing to Florida State. They received an at-large bid to the NCAA tournament where they defeated Saint Louis and Liberty to advanced to the sweet sixteen for the first time since 1965 where they lost to fellow ACC member Duke.

Offseason

Departures

Incoming Transfers

2019 recruiting class

Roster

Schedule and results

Source:

|-
!colspan=12 style=| Regular season

|-
!colspan=12 style=| ACC tournament

References

Virginia Tech Hokies men's basketball seasons
Virginia Tech
Virginia Tech
Virginia Tech